Alexandre Vladimirovich "Sasha" Fadeev (born 4 January 1964) is a Russian former competitive figure skater who represented the Soviet Union. Fadeyev is the 1985 World champion and a four-time European champion.

Personal life
Alexandre "Sasha" Fadeev was born in Kazan, Russian SFSR, Soviet Union. He is married to a Canadian figure skater, Cydèle Fadeeva, and resides in Illinois.

Career
Fadeev won bronze at the 1979 World Junior Championships and then gold the following year. In the 1983–84 season, he won his first European title and stepped onto his first World podium, taking the bronze medal.

Fadeev won the 1985 World Championships by placing first in all three segments of the competition including compulsory figures and the short and long programs. He took the gold medal ahead of Brian Orser (silver) and Brian Boitano (bronze).

At the 1986 World Championships, Fadeev entered the long program with a comfortable lead and needed only a third place in the long program to defend his title. Five major mistakes, however, placed him fifth in the segment and third overall. He took the bronze medal behind Brian Boitano (gold) and Brian Orser (silver).

Receiving several 6.0s, Fadeev regained his European title in 1987. He repeated as the bronze medalist at the World Championships, finishing third again behind Orser and Boitano in Cincinnati.

In the 1987–88 season, Fadeev won his fourth national title and third European title. At the 1988 Winter Olympics in Calgary, he skated the best compulsory figures but his placements in the short (9th) and free programs (4th) dropped him out of the medals to fourth overall. He withdrew from the World Championships.

In 1988–89, Fadeev won the NHK Trophy and fifth Soviet national title. He scored four perfect 6.0s on the way to his fourth European title. At the 1989 World Championships, he led after the compulsory figures but dropped to fourth overall after poor placements in the short and free programs.

In the 1989–90 season, Fadeev took the silver medal at the 1989 NHK Trophy, second to Petrenko but ahead of reigning World champion Kurt Browning. He defeated Viktor Petrenko to win the 1990 Soviet national title but did not appear again in amateur competition.

Fadeev was a cast member of the 1998 movie The Christmas Angel: A Story on Ice, as well as the Gershwin on Ice theatre show with Tiffany Chin. He currently works as a coach in the Chicago area.

Results

Note: At the 1988 World Championships, Fadeev was in 1st place after the compulsory figures before withdrawing from the competition before the short program.

References

Skatabase: 1980s Worlds Results
Skatabase: 1980s Europeans Results
Skatabase: 1980s Olympics Results

Navigation

1964 births
Living people
Russian male single skaters
Soviet male single skaters
Olympic figure skaters of the Soviet Union
Figure skaters at the 1984 Winter Olympics
Figure skaters at the 1988 Winter Olympics
World Figure Skating Championships medalists
European Figure Skating Championships medalists
World Junior Figure Skating Championships medalists
Sportspeople from Kazan
Russian emigrants to the United States